Ram Bachhan Ahir (Yadhav) is a Nepalese politician, belonging to the Madhesi Janadhikar Forum. In the 2008 Constituent Assembly election he was elected from the Nawalparasi-5 constituency, winning 13641 votes.

References

Living people
Year of birth missing (living people)
Madhesi Jana Adhikar Forum, Nepal politicians
People from Kaski District

Members of the 1st Nepalese Constituent Assembly